A by-election was held for the New South Wales Legislative Assembly electorate of Newtown on 25 February 1888. The election was triggered by the resignation of William Foster, a member of the Free Trade Party, who had accepted appointment as a judge of the Supreme Court.

Dates

Results

William Foster was appointed a judge of the Supreme Court.

See also
Electoral results for the district of Newtown
List of New South Wales state by-elections

References

1888 elections in Australia
New South Wales state by-elections
1880s in New South Wales